The 2019 NCAA Division I women's soccer season was the 38th season of NCAA championship women's college soccer.

Preseason

Coaching changes

New stadiums opening

New programs 
The Merrimack Warriors began the transition from Division II to Division I and joined the Northeast Conference.

Long Island University announced in October 2018 that its two then-current athletic programs—the Division I LIU Brooklyn Blackbirds and the Division II LIU Post Pioneers—would merge into a single Division I athletic program under the LIU name after the 2018–19 school year. The unified program, which maintains LIU Brooklyn's Division I and Northeast Conference memberships, announced its new nickname of Sharks on May 15, 2019. With both campuses sponsoring women's soccer, the two teams became a single LIU team based at the Post campus in Nassau County, New York in the 2019 season.

Three schools that sponsor women's soccer began transitions from Division II in the 2020–21 school year. Bellarmine joinrf the ASUN Conference, Dixie State joined the Western Athletic Conference, and UC San Diego will join the Big West Conference.

Rebranded programs
In addition to LIU, one other Division I women's soccer program assumed a new athletic identity during the 2018–19 offseason. On July 1, 2019, the University of Missouri–Kansas City (UMKC) announced that its athletic program, previously known as the UMKC Kangaroos, would henceforth be known as the Kansas City Roos, with "Roos" having long been used as a short form of the historic "Kangaroos" nickname.

Conference realignment 

This was also the final season for four programs in their current conferences. The Cal State Bakersfield Roadrunners and Kansas City Roos will both leave the Western Athletic Conference in July 2020, with the Roadrunners joining the Big West Conference and the Roos returning to their former conference home of the Summit League. At the same time, the Purdue Fort Wayne Mastodons will leave the Summit League for the Horizon League, and the UConn Huskies will leave the American Athletic Conference to join several of their former conference mates in the Big East Conference.

Season outlook

Preseason polls

Regular season

Major upsets 
In this list, a "major upset" is defined as a game won by a team ranked 10 or more spots lower or an unranked team that defeats a team ranked #15 or higher.

All rankings are from the United Soccer Coaches Poll.

Conference standings

Conference winners and tournaments

Postseason

NCAA Tournament

Final rankings

Award winners

All-America teams

Major player of the year awards 
 Hermann Trophy:
 TopDrawerSoccer.com National Player of the Year Award:

Other major awards 
 United Soccer Coaches College Coach of the Year:
 Bill Jeffrey Award:
 Glenn Myernick Award:
 Jerry Yeagley Award:
 Mike Berticelli Award:
 NCAA Tournament MVP:

See also 
 College soccer
 List of NCAA Division I women's soccer programs
 2019 in American soccer
 2019 NCAA Division I Women's Soccer Tournament
 2019 NCAA Division I men's soccer season

References 

 
NCAA